Chaotian may refer to:

Chaotian District, in Guangyuan, Sichuan, China
Chaotian Palace, in Nanjing, Jiangsu, China
Chaotian Temple, in Beigang, Yunlin County, Taiwan
Chaotian (geology), an unofficial proposed subdivision of the Hadean eon